Old Log Church (Oak Forest Baptist Church) is an historic church in Riverside, Kentucky.

It was built in 1891 and added to the National Register in 1979.

References

Baptist churches in Kentucky
Churches on the National Register of Historic Places in Kentucky
Churches completed in 1891
19th-century churches in the United States
Churches in Warren County, Kentucky
National Register of Historic Places in Warren County, Kentucky
Wooden churches in Kentucky
Log buildings and structures on the National Register of Historic Places in Kentucky
1891 establishments in Kentucky